The 1985 NCAA Division I softball season, play of college softball in the United States organized by the National Collegiate Athletic Association (NCAA) at the Division I level, began in February 1985.  The season progressed through the regular season, many conference tournaments and championship series, and concluded with the 1985 NCAA Division I softball tournament and 1985 Women's College World Series.  The Women's College World Series, consisting of the eight remaining teams in the NCAA Tournament and held in Omaha, Nebraska at Seymour Smith Park, ended on May 26, 1985.

Conference standings

Women's College World Series
The 1985 NCAA Women's College World Series took place from May 22 to May 26, 1985 in Omaha, Nebraska.

Season leaders
Batting
Batting average: .488 – Mary Baldauf, Harvard Crimson
RBIs: 50 – Karen Allen, Nicholls Colonels
Home runs: 18 – Liz Mizera, Texas A&M Aggies

Pitching
WINS: 48-16 – Rhonda Wheatley, Cal Poly Pomona Broncos
ERA: 0.08 (2 ER/167.1 IP) – Tracy Compton, UCLA Bruins
Strikeouts: 337 – Julie Buldoc, Adelphi Panthers

Records
NCAA Division I season innings pitched:
434.1 – Rhonda Wheatley, Cal Poly Pomona Broncos

Sophomore class scoreless innings streak:
90.0 – Lisa Ishikawa, Northwestern Wildcats; 1985

Sophomore class WHIP:
0.39 (66 H+50 BB/298.0 IP) – Shawn Andaya, Texas A&M Aggies

Senior class ERA:
0.08 (2 ER/167.1 IP) – Tracy Compton, UCLA Bruins

Team double plays:
82 – UC Santa Barbara Gauchos

Team single game hits:
41 – Canisius Golden Griffins, May 1, 1985

Team single game runs:
48 – Canisius Golden Griffins, May 1, 1985

Team single game RBIs:
39 – Canisius Golden Griffins, May 1, 1985

Team largest victory margin:
43 – Canisius Golden Griffins, May 1, 1985

Awards
Honda Sports Award Softball:
Denise Eckert, Nebraska Cornhuskers

References